Western United Football Club is an Australian professional football club. The club is based in the western Melbourne suburb of Tarneit, the club aims to represent western Victoria, incorporating the western suburbs of Melbourne; the regional cities of Ballarat, Bendigo, and Geelong; and regional and country towns in western Victoria.

The club was first established as part of an expansion process in the country's premier football competition, the A-League. It began playing in the 2019–20 A-League season, under licence from Football Australia (FA). On May 12, 2022, it announced the establishment of an A-League Women team.

Western United currently play home matches at AAMI Park in Melbourne, Mars Stadium in Ballarat and University of Tasmania Stadium in Launceston, though plan to permanently relocate matches to Wyndham City Stadium, a soccer-specific stadium in Tarneit, Wyndham.

History

Origins

In August 2018, the Western Melbourne Group was one of the eight teams that the FFA had accepted in the official bidding phase, as part of the new expansion process. Four months later, the bid's success was announced, along with the bid from Macarthur FC. Western Melbourne will play its home games at Kardinia Park in Geelong for its first two seasons, while it builds its stadium and training centre in Tarneit, with completion expected in 2021.

On 11 January 2019, Western Melbourne Group announced John Anastasiadis as senior assistant coach for the club's debut season. On 24 January 2019, the consortium announced that John Hutchinson would also join the club as an assistant coach.

On 31 January 2019, Western Melbourne made its first player and marquee signing Panagiotis Kone ahead of its inaugural season. On 12 February 2019, Socceroos defender Josh Risdon became Western Melbourne's first Australian signing.

On 13 February 2019, it was announced that the club would be called Western United Football Club after a public vote was held through the Herald Sun newspaper. The club's colours of green and black were also chosen
via the same public vote.

In May 2019, Western United announced partnership with sports brand Kappa. Two months later, the club unveiled their inaugural jerseys for their first season in the A-League, featuring green and black stripes.

On 2 June 2019 the Director of Football for Western United, Steve Horvat presented Geelong representative players with their kits for the 2019 Country Championships. Horvat additionally announced the club would set up a Geelong-based academy by 2021.

On 28 May 2022 they became A-League champions, defeating defending champions Melbourne City in the 2022 A-League Men Grand Final. Their Grand Final win saw Western United became just the second expansion side ever to win the A-League Championship, the quickest expansion side to win the championship, the first team since to triumph in their first grand final appearance since Brisbane Roar in 2011, and one of just two teams to have won the championship after finishing outside the top two, with Melbourne Victory first achieving this feat in 2018.

A-League Women's Team
Western United Women also joined the A-League Women for the 2022–23 season, which, with the return of Central Coast Mariners, will expand that league to 12 teams.

Crest
Western United unveiled its official crest in May 2019, which features a stylised 'W' symbol. The club commented that the design was influenced by the pitch of roofs in the suburbs and the West Gate Bridge, with the signature green colour representing growth, harmony and freshness.

Colours
On 13 February 2019, the club revealed that its primary colours will be green and black.

On 18 June 2019, through consulting with Kappa and fans, the club officially unveiled its inaugural home and alternative kits for the 2019–20 A-League season. The home kit consists of green and black vertical stripes where the Western United logo is encased in a faint crest. The alternative kit takes a different approach with a geometric design with varying sized green and black triangles connecting each other through their points. The club's logo is also contained at the bottom of the kit. This design is said to reflect on the club's modern approach in the club's branding.

Sponsors 
On 20 May 2019, Western United announced a partnership with Italian sports brand Kappa, which will be the club's inaugural official apparel partner.

Western United announced Probuild as its inaugural sponsor on 3 July 2019 where its logo will be present on the front of its playing kits as well as other apparel.

Ownership
It was revealed in February 2019 that Birmingham Sports Holdings had initially funded the bid's license fee. They later pulled out of the project due to a downturn in the Australian housing market, that devalued the intended housing developments to be built in the same area as the proposed new stadium in Tarneit.

Stadia

For several years after their establishment, Western United used the City Vista Recreation Reserve, the home ground of Caroline Springs George Cross FC as their training base. In October 2021 the club moved its senior men's team and administration staff to The Hangar in Tullamarine, an Australian rules football facility that is home to the Essendon Football Club and Paralympics Australia. The club will be based at the Hangar until the proposed facilities at Tarneit are complete.

Western United's proposed training facilities in Tarneit will be built adjacent to the Wyndham City Stadium, and will be based on a  site, with a two-story building featuring a range of training and gym facilities, function and media spaces, change rooms and staff facilities, kiosks, public toilets and a first aid room, as well as three full-sized pitches, including one with a 5,000 capacity which will be capable of hosting A-League matches. The three pitches will consist of a main grass pitch, which will serve as the main training base for Western United's A-Leagues teams and future girls and boys academy teams and will be suitable for A-League Women's and NPL standard matches, a second grass pitch, which will be suitable for community-level competitive games and can also be used as a training pitch, and a synthetic pitch, which can be used for both training and matches. It is planned that the two grass pitches will be occupied by Western United A-Leagues teams throughout the year while the third, synthetic field will be utilised by the club's academy and community engagement activities. Construction of the training facilities commenced in March 2022 and is due for completion in May 2023, with the club planning to move into its new base by July-August 2023. Western United plan to play their 2023–24 season home games on their main training pitch, before moving into the Wyndham City Stadium once construction has completed.

For the 2022-23 A-League season, the club will play its home matches at AAMI Park in Melbourne and Eureka Stadium in North Ballarat. The club previously played majority of its home matches at GMHBA Stadium in Geelong, however they played their last A-League match there in December 2021, shifting to AAMI Park in Melbourne as their primary home venue until their facilities in Tarneit have been completed.

As of 25 October 2022.

Wyndham City Stadium 

The club has proposed building a 15,000 seated stadium in Tarneit, Victoria. The stadium would be the first major venue in the country to be exclusively owned and operated by an A-League club. The proposal, to be funded entirely privately, has received planning approval from the Victorian Government, and the club has stated it expects construction to commence in mid-2021 with a view to completion by mid-2023.

On 6 December 2019, Western United announced that site investigations had been completed and that construction is expected to commence in mid-2020. On 18 September 2020, Western United announced that a training facility would be built adjacent to the new stadium development. The training facility is planned to have two grass and one artificial football pitch, along with seating for 5,000 spectators. The main grass pitch, with the 5,000 seat stand would be used as the training base by Western United, while the other two pitches would have shared community use. The press release also revealed that the club has completed all of the site investigations required to develop a concept masterplan for the new stadium and that planning submission has been submitted to the Department of Environment, Land, Water and Planning (DELWP) for approval. The release also states that construction on the new precinct will commence in early 2021, to be completed by early 2023. On 22 September 2021 Western Melbourne Group, the football club's parent company, announced that "in the week commencing 25 October 2021, early works on the site at Leakes Road, Tarneit will commence" which would create access roads to the construction site. The announcement also advised that planning approval for the stadium had not yet been received and that timelines for completion had been refreshed in light of the COVID-19 pandemic.

As of May 2022, construction on the Wyndham City Stadium is still yet to commence, with Western United chairman Jason Sourasis admitting that the club were "naive" to declare they would be able to build a new stadium within two years of their inception. The stadium is now anticipated to become operational in 2026. The club plan to start playing matches at the Wyndham Regional Football Facility in 2023 - a small training stadium with a capacity of approximately 5,000 spectators located within the same precinct of the future Wyndham City Stadium.

Supporters and rivalries

Western United's fanbase are referred to as the "Western Service Crew". The fanbase started in less than a year since the club's foundation which grew to 2,800 members on the Western Service Crew's Facebook page in support of Western United. Throughout the 2020–21 season however, Western United struggled with crowd numbers. This caused them to have the lowest attendance in A-League Men history with 990 people attending a match between Western United and the Newcastle Jets on 26 April 2021. At the end of the 2020–21 A-League season, Western United lost a total home attendance of around 26,000 people reported by Sporting News of every clubs' attendance figures for the season. A month after the season end, an opinioned report was made in "The Roar" newspaper of Western United's "embarrassing stadium fiasco". This contained evidence of the club losing supporters due to playing in different home stadiums like Mars Stadium and Whitten Oval.

Ever since joining the A-League, Western United have consistently suffered from low attendances: the club had the second-lowest average attendance out of all clubs in the 2019–20 and 2021–22 seasons, and had the lowest average attendance of all clubs in the 2020–21 season.

Rivalries

 Melbourne Victory (The Westgate Derby / The Battle of the Bridge) -  Upon joining the A-League in the 2019–20 season as the third club in Melbourne, Western United has developed a rivalry with Melbourne Victory. Despite the rivalry's short existence, it has garnered a reputation for producing talking points, controversy, tension, goals and drama. In the team's first meeting, in November 2019 at Marvel Stadium, Western United won 3-2 despite going 2-0 down within the first 7 minutes. In February 2021 at Marvel Stadium, despite conceding the first goal of the match and despite being reduced to 10 men for the final half-hour of the match, Western United won 4–3, with Victor Sanchez scoring in the final minute of stoppage time. After keeping the Victory winless for the first 5 matches of the rivalry (4 wins, 1 draw), Melbourne Victory ended their losing run in emphatic fashion on 28 May 2021, beating Western United 6–1 at AAMI Park. Currently six former Victory players have played for Western United (four have played for the Victory senior team, two have represented the Victory's youth or NPL teams without making an appearance for the senior team).

Statistics and records

Connor Pain holds the record for most Western United appearances, having played 80 first-team matches. Dylan Pierias comes second, having played 74 times. The most appearances for a goalkeeper is Filip Kurto who played 36 times for Western United.

Besart Berisha is the club's top goalscorer with 26 goals in all competitions and has been their top goalscorer since the club's foundation in 2018. Western United's record home attendance is 10,128, for an A-League Men match against Melbourne Victory on 8 December 2019 at GMHBA Stadium.

Season by season record

Key

R32 – Round of 32
season still ongoing

SF – Semi-finals

Honours

Domestic

A-League
 A-League Men Championship
Winners (1): 2022

Esports
 E-League (Australia) Championship
Winners, Dylan Campbell(1): E-League (Australia)

Players

First team squad

Youth

Players to have been featured in a first-team matchday squad for Western United.

Coaching staff
Football Department

See also
 Expansion of the A-League
 Western United FC (A-League Women)

Notes

References

External links
 Official club website

 
Soccer clubs in Melbourne
Association football clubs established in 2018
A-League Men teams
Expansion of the A-League Men
2018 establishments in Australia